Allan Ferguson Murray  (31 May 1907 – 1995) was an English footballer who played as a central defender for Rochdale, Fulham and Bristol Rovers. He also played non-league football for various other clubs.

References

Rochdale A.F.C. players
Fulham F.C. players
Bristol Rovers F.C. players
Great Harwood F.C. players
Darwen F.C. players
Crystal Palace F.C. players
Milford United F.C. players
Bath City F.C. players
People from Heywood, Greater Manchester
English footballers
Association football defenders
1907 births
1995 deaths